Yuan Hong is the name of:

Yuan Hong (historian) (328–376), Jin dynasty official and historian
Emperor Xiaowen of Northern Wei (467–499), Northern Wei emperor known as Yuan Hong after 496
Yuan Hong (actor) (born 1982), Chinese actor